Rahul Nambiar is an Indian playback singer and live performer. An MBA and M.Com-graduate, he won the Swapthaswarangal show in 2001 and began singing live. He sung more than 2000 songs in movies,He later ventured into playback singing, performing for many leading South Indian film composers in various languages.

Career

Rahul hails from Kannur, Kerala and was brought up in Delhi and Chennai. After completing his MBA and M.Com, Rahul started working for two years in a bank, which he felt was too "monotonous", before performing at live shows with Sunitha Sarathy.<ref name="hinduonnet2007">{{cite web |url=http://www.hinduonnet.com/thehindu/mp/2007/05/15/stories/2007051550160100.htm |title=The Hindu : Metro Plus Chennai : 'Versatility is important |website=www.hinduonnet.com |access-date=17 January 2022 |archive-url=https://web.archive.org/web/20080226070936/http://www.hinduonnet.com/thehindu/mp/2007/05/15/stories/2007051550160100.htm |archive-date=26 February 2008 |url-status=usurped}}</ref> In 2001, he won the Sun TV Sapthaswarangal contest, beating 3000 contestants, following which he decided to pursue a singing career. Rahul was introduced as a playback singer by Vijay Antony in the Tamil film Dishyum.

In 2009, Rahul joined hands with his longtime friend and bass player Aalap Raju to form a band named RAHLAAP. The duo released a self-titled album in Hindi language based on "Music beyond genres", on which they had worked for four years. He is considered a versatile singer, having sung in various genres such as Western, Carnatic, light music and hip-hop. Rahul has performed more than 400 live shows around India and abroad, and over 350 songs for films, most prominent ones being Mani Sharma's "Vasantha Mullai" (Pokkiri), Yuvan Shankar Raja's "Adada Mazhada" (Paiyaa) which fetched him his first Filmfare nomination for the Best Male Playback Singer Award. In 2012, he won his first Filmfare award in the Best Male Playback Singer Award category for Thaman's "Guruvaram" song (Dookudu). He has also lent his voice for several ad jingles.

Rahul Nambiar since 2019 is also part of a trio called MAKKA'' with his musician friends Aalap Raju and Ranjith Govind, where they perform some rocking cine and non-film songs. Their performance is an extension of their years of friendship. MAKKA has released quite a few cover songs on their Youtube channel & their own compositions like Valentine Oru Vaalu & MAKKA SONG.

Discography

References

External links
 RAHLAAP – official website
 
 - Rahul Nambiar's YouTube Page
 RAHLAAP - RAHLAAP's YouTube page
 - MAKKA's YouTube page
 - Filmography Reference
 - MAKKA reference

Living people
Indian male playback singers
21st-century Indian singers
Telugu playback singers
Tamil playback singers
Malayalam playback singers
Kannada playback singers
Singers from Kannur
Film musicians from Kerala
Indian male pop singers
21st-century Indian male singers
1981 births